Khuzhir (Khujar) is a rural locality (a settlement) in Dzhidinsky District, Republic of Buryatia, Russia. The population was 31 as of 2010.

Geography 
Khuzhir is located 71 km southeast of Petropavlovka (the district's administrative centre) by road. Zarubino is the nearest rural locality.

References 

Rural localities in Dzhidinsky District